Adam Nemec (born 2 September 1985) is a Slovak professional footballer who plays as a forward for Liga I side FC Voluntari. In his career, he has played in seven different countries but mostly for teams in Germany and Romania. During 13 years of international career, he won 43 caps and scored 13 goals.

Personal life
His father, named Milan Nemec, was also footballer who represented Czechoslovakia.

Club career

Žilina
When playing for MSK Žilina from 2004 to 2007, the team became Slovakian champion in 2007.

Erzgebirge Aue
In August 2007, he signed a loan deal with the 2. Bundesliga side Erzgebirge Aue where he scored ten goals and provided seven assists in 29 games.

Genk
On 11 June 2008, Nemec signed a four-year deal with Belgian club KRC Genk. He remained at the club for only one season however, in which he scored four goals in 21 matches.

Kaiserslautern
In July 2009, he was involved in talks over a move to Scottish Premier League club Heart of Midlothian which ultimately failed. On 28 July 2009, however, Nemec signed a three-year contract for 1. FC Kaiserslautern, returning to Germany's second division.

Reportedly falling from a cherry tree in his garden in June 2011, Nemec suffered injuries including broken ribs, a broken collarbone that required surgery, and a concussion which kept him out of football for about three months. He returned to training in early September. He left the club during the mid-season break in January 2012, after having appeared in 61 league matches and scoring nine goals in his two and a half seasons.

Ingolstadt 04
On 27 January 2012, Nemec joined FC Ingolstadt until the end of the season. He made his competitive debut for the club on 4 February 2012 in a 1–1 draw in the league with Fortuna Düsseldorf.

Union Berlin
On 24 July 2012, he signed a two-year contract with Union Berlin in the German second division until June 2014. In December 2013, his contract was extended for another two years until 2016 including a mutual extension clause for another year. Only five months later though, in April 2014, he was allowed to leave the club effective the end of the 2013–14 season, however he stayed with Union.

After playing in just five games through the first half of the season, he was released. Union manager Norbert Düwel said: "It is a pity that cooperation has not worked as both sides had imagined. Under these circumstances, it is better to part ways."

New York City
On 25 January 2015, he signed with Major League Soccer club New York City FC. Originally a starter, he lost his starting lineup position due to his poor play. In his nine games playing for the team, he was disappointing and didn't make an impact. In 594 minutes he did not score a goal and did not have an assist.

On 31 August 2015, New York City FC and Nemec agreed to a mutual termination of his contract.

Willem II
On 31 August 2015, fifteen minutes before the closing of the transfer window, Nemec signed a one-year deal with Dutch Eredivisie side Willem II.

Dinamo București
On 6 September 2016, Nemec signed a two-year deal with Romanian side Dinamo București.

In his first season with the club, on 20 May 2017 Nemec scored two goals in the final match of 2016–17 Cupa Ligii. Dinamo defeated ACS Poli Timișoara 2–0 and won this trophy for the first time in history. At the same time, it was the only trophy Nemec won in Romania.

On 10 May 2018, Dinamo's coach Florin Bratu confirmed, that after expiration of his contract with Dinamo, Nemec wants to leave the club. At the national team meeting, on 29 May, Nemec confirmed that his intention to depart and added, that his subsequent contract will be his last professional one, adding that he seeks a financially attractive deal or else he prefers a return home.

On 29 August 2020, he returned to Dinamo București on a one-year contract, with an option for an additional year.

Pafos
On 27 August 2018, he joined Pafos of the Cypriot First Division on a one-year contract, with an option for an additional year. He scored 16 goals in the league, winning the golden boot as well.

International career
Nemec debuted with the senior team on 9 February 2011, but he scored his first goal in a game against Malta over three years later, under Ján Kozák, who used him in seven of ten games in a Euro 2016 qualifying campaign, towards which Nemec contributed with three goals. In 2018 FIFA World Cup qualification, Nemec was crowned Slovakia's top scorer, as he scored 5 of Slovakia's 17 goals in the campaign. Slovakia finished second in Group F, but did not qualify for the play-off round.

On 22 February 2019, Nemec announced his retirement from international football at the age of 33, along with two national team defenders Tomáš Hubočan and Martin Škrtel. However, the trio shared a farewell game on 13 October 2019 in a friendly against Paraguay, which coincided with a national team return to Tehelné pole, after ten years. Nemec played in the starting XI and was substituted by Róbert Boženík after some 30 minutes. Slovakia tied the game 1–1. With Nemec being seen as a sharp-shooter of the past five years, it was seen as a symbolic moment, since Boženík was at the time expected to replace the role of Nemec as national team's center forward and goalscorer. In the match Boženík had fulfilled his duty, scoring a surprising opening goal after 60 minutes, utilising a pass from László Bénes. Nemec had commended the 19 year-old in a post-match interview.

At the time of his international retirement, he remained one of only nine players to have scored more than ten goals for Slovakia. He tied Stanislav Šesták as Slovakia's fifth top scorer with 13 goals and had topped Slovak legends, such as Peter Dubovský or Ľubomír Moravčík. He also tied Harry Kane as the top goalscorer of 2018 FIFA World Cup qualification - UEFA Group F, with five goals.

Career statistics

Club

International

Scores and results list Slovakia's goal tally first, score column indicates score after each Nemec goal.

Honours
Žilina
Slovak Super Liga: 2006–07
Slovak Super Cup: 2004, 2007

Genk
Belgian Cup: 2008–09

1. FC Kaiserslautern
2. Bundesliga: 2009–10

Dinamo București
Cupa Ligii: 2016–17

FC Voluntari
Cupa României runner-up: 2021–22

Slovakia
King's Cup: 2018

Individual
 Liga I Team of the Season: 2016–17
 Cypriot First Division top scorer: 2018–19 (16 goals)

References

External links

Adam Nemec at Slovak Football Association 

1985 births
Living people
Sportspeople from Žiar nad Hronom
Slovak footballers
Association football forwards
Slovakia international footballers
UEFA Euro 2016 players
Slovak Super Liga players
Belgian Pro League players
Bundesliga players
2. Bundesliga players
Major League Soccer players
Eredivisie players
Liga I players
Cypriot First Division players
MŠK Žilina players
FC Erzgebirge Aue players
K.R.C. Genk players
1. FC Kaiserslautern players
FC Ingolstadt 04 players
1. FC Union Berlin players
New York City FC players
Willem II (football club) players
FC Dinamo București players
Pafos FC players
FC Voluntari players
Slovak expatriate footballers
Slovak expatriate sportspeople in Germany
Expatriate footballers in Germany
Slovak expatriate sportspeople in Belgium
Expatriate footballers in Belgium
Slovak expatriate sportspeople in the United States
Expatriate soccer players in the United States
Slovak expatriate sportspeople in the Netherlands
Expatriate footballers in the Netherlands
Slovak expatriate sportspeople in Romania
Expatriate footballers in Romania
Slovak expatriate sportspeople in Cyprus
Expatriate footballers in Cyprus